Kepler-89e, also known as KOI-94e, is an exoplanet in the constellation of Cygnus. It orbits Kepler-89.

Physical properties
It is classed as a type III planet, making it cloudless and blue, and giving it the appearance of a larger version of Uranus and Neptune. It has a mass around 35 times that of Earth. It has a similar density to Saturn, 0.60 g/cm3, giving it a radius 6.56 times that of the Earth. It orbits an F-type main-sequence star at a distance of 0.305 astronomical units (au), with a period of 54.32031 days, making its orbit smaller than that of Mercury's. It has a very low eccentricity of 0.019. It has a temperature of 584 K.

Kepler-89e orbits the star Kepler-89. Kepler-89 has a mass of 1.18 solar masses, and a radius of 1.32 solar radii. It is 3.3 billion years old, younger than the Sun, making its planets about 3,000,000,000 years old (3 Gyr). It has a temperature of 6,210 K, making it appear bright yellowish-white.

References

Transiting exoplanets
Exoplanets discovered in 2013
Cygnus (constellation)